Achelous is a relatively fresh crater on Ganymede adjacent to the similarly sized Gula. It has an outer lobate ejecta deposit extending about a crater radius from the rim. 

A characteristic feature of both craters, almost identical in size, is the "pedestal" - an outward-facing, relatively gently sloped scarp that terminates the continuous ejecta blanket. Similar features may be seen in ejecta blankets of Martian craters, suggesting impacts into a volatile (ice)-rich target material. Furthermore, both craters appear crisp and feature terraces. Gula has a prominent central peak; Achelous instead may show the remnant of a collapsed central peak or a central pit that is not fully formed. On lower-resolution images taken under higher sun illumination angle, both craters are shown to have extended bright rays, especially Achelous, which demonstrates that these two craters are younger than the respective surrounding landscape.

Impact craters on Ganymede (moon)